Odesa British Athletic Club (In Russian: «Одесский британский атлетический клуб» ОБАК in short, meaning: Odessian British Athletic Club) was an earlier Imperial Russian athletic club from Odesa, which was established on 1878 by British workers of the Indo-European Telegraph Company who in 1877 moved from Kerch to Odesa.

History
The city of Odesa was the biggest city of the Imperial Russian South-West (see, Southwestern Krai) and was a municipality (Gradonachalstvo, an Imperial Russian administrative unit of the same level as governorate (gubernia) and oblast). In 1877 to the city from Kerch moved the Indo-European Telegraph Company that employed many Brits (subjects of British Crown). In 1878 they organized the Odesa British Athletic Club (OBAC) which among other sports competitions cultivated the game of association football.

They played at the field located in a neighborhood of Malofontanskaya doroga (Little-fountain Road), not far from a sea shore. For a long time OBAC was composed exclusively out of English only and beside playing between themselves, they conducted annual meetings with footballers of the Romanian city of Galați.

Honors 
 Odesa Football Championship: 1911, 1912, 
☆2> 1913

Statistics

Odesa Football League

Known Players 
 Ernest Jacobs 
 Hubert Townend 
 Sergey Utochkin

References

External links
Information on UkrSoccerHistory
 Ukrainian soccer clubs in Imperial Russia

Football clubs in Odesa
Defunct football clubs in Ukraine
Association football clubs established in 1878
Association football clubs disestablished in 1917
Football in the Russian Empire
1878 establishments in the Russian Empire
1917 disestablishments in Russia
British association football clubs outside the United Kingdom
Works association football clubs in Russia